Washington Township is one of the nineteen townships of Guernsey County, Ohio, United States. As of the 2010 census the population was 456.

Geography
Located in the northeastern part of the county, it borders the following townships:
Perry Township, Tuscarawas County – north
Freeport Township, Harrison County – northeast
Londonderry Township – southeast
Madison Township – south
Jefferson Township – southwest corner
Monroe Township – west

No municipalities are located in Washington Township.

Name and history
Washington Township was organized in 1823. It is one of forty-three Washington Townships statewide.

Government
The township is governed by a three-member board of trustees, who are elected in November of odd-numbered years to a four-year term beginning on the following January 1. Two are elected in the year after the presidential election and one is elected in the year before it. There is also an elected township fiscal officer, who serves a four-year term beginning on April 1 of the year after the election, which is held in November of the year before the presidential election. Vacancies in the fiscal officership or on the board of trustees are filled by the remaining trustees.

References

External links
County website

Townships in Guernsey County, Ohio
Townships in Ohio